Guam, US...
 Guam High School (Guam)

South Korea...
 Guam High School (Daegu)
 Masan Guam High School
 Guham High School, Seoul